One hundred and eighty-six Guggenheim Fellowships were awarded in 2005. Institutional affiliation is listed if applicable.

U.S. and Canadian Fellows

Latin American and Caribbean Fellows

See also
 Guggenheim Fellowship
 List of Guggenheim Fellowships awarded in 2004
 List of Guggenheim Fellowships awarded in 2006

References

2005
2005 awards
Gugg